HC Dobrogea Sud Constanța is a handball team from Constanța, Romania, formed in July 2015 after the extinction of HCM Constanța (due to high debts that the club had accumulated). After one year in the second division, the team was promoted to the Liga Națională.

Kits

Honours 
 Liga Națională  
Runners-up (1): 2019

 Cupa României  
Winners (1): 2018

 Supercupa României  
Winners (2): 2017, 2021

Team

Current squad 
Squad for the 2020–21 season

Goalkeepers
 16  Dan Vasile
 12  Gabriel Preda
 88  Gabriel Chilianu
Left Wingers
7  Alexandru Andrei
 78  Mihai Loghin
Right Wingers
5  Ionuț Nistor
 31  Strahinja Stankovic
Line players
 23  Zoran Nikolić
 43  Daniel Susanu

Left Backs
8  Irakli Chikovani
 34  Vitaly Komogorov
 36  Andrei Bruj
 27  Marin Vegar
 21  Liviu Caba
Central Backs
 10  Gabriel Ilie
 11  Leon Rašo
Right Backs
 17  Ionuț Stănescu
 15  Marko Buvinic

Coaching staff
Staff for the 2020–21 season

HCM Constanța
HCM Constanța was founded in 2002 and extinguished in 2015.

Honours
Liga Națională (9):
Gold: 2004, 2006, 2007, 2009, 2010, 2011, 2012, 2013, 2014
Cupa României (5):
Winners: 2006, 2011, 2012, 2013, 2014
Supercupa României (4):
Winners: 2008, 2011, 2013, 2014
EHF Cup:
Fourth place: 2014
EHF Cup Winners' Cup:
Semifinalists: 2006
Quarterfinalists: 2007, 2009
EHF Challenge Cup:
Semifinalists: 2004

Famous players
 Mihai Popescu
 Ionuț Stănescu  
 Laurențiu Toma 
 Marius Sadoveac
 Alexandru Csepreghi
 George Buricea
 Marius Stavrositu
 Bogdan Criciotoiu
 Javier Humet 
 Milutin Dragicevic
 Dalibor Čutura 
 Nemanja Mladenović
 Nikola Crnoglavac
 Zoran Nikolić
 Dane Šijan
 Predrag Vujadinović
 Mladen Rakčević
 Stevan Vujović
 Aleksandar Adžić
 Branislav Angelovski
 Nikola Mitrevski
 Velko Markoski
 Viachaslau Saldatsenka 
 Janko Kević
 Dejan Malinović
 Timuzsin Schuch
 Irakli Chikovani

References

External links
HC Dobrogea Sud Official website

Romanian handball clubs
Sport in Constanța
Handball clubs established in 2015
2015 establishments in Romania
Liga Națională (men's handball)